AD 9 (IX) was a common year starting on Tuesday of the Julian calendar. In the Roman Empire, it was known as the Year of the Consulship of Sabinus and Camerinus (or, less frequently, 762 Ab urbe condita). The denomination "AD 9" for this year has been used since the late medieval period, when the Anno Domini calendar era became the prevalent method in Europe for naming years.

Events

By place

China 
 January 10 – Wang Mang founds the short-lived Xin Dynasty in China (until AD 25). Wang Mang names his wife, Wang, empress and his son, Wang Lin Crown Prince, heir to the throne.
 Empress Wang is given the title of Duchess Dowager of Ding'an, while Ruzi Ying, the former Emperor of Han, becomes the Duke of Ding'an. Ruzi Ying is placed under house arrest.

Roman Empire 
 c. September 9 – Battle of the Teutoburg Forest: Legio XVII, XVIII and XIX are lured by Arminius into an ambush and defeated by his tribe, the Cherusci, and their Germanic allies. The Roman aquilae are lost and the Roman general and governor Publius Quinctilius Varus commits suicide. Legio II Augusta, XX Valeria Victrix, and XIII Gemina move to Germany to replace the lost legions.
 The Bellum Batonianum (Great Illyrian Revolt) in Dalmatia is suppressed.
 First record of the subdivision of the province of Illyricum into lower (Pannonia) and upper (Dalmatia) regions.
 In order to increase the number of marriages, and ultimately the population, the Lex Papia Poppaea is adopted in Italy. This law prohibits celibacy and childless relationships.
 Roman finances become strained following the Danubian insurrection and the Battle of the Teutoburg Forest, resulting in the levying of two new taxes: five percent on inheritances, and one percent on sales.
 Cunobeline is first recorded to be king of the Catuvellauni at Camulodunum (modern-day Colchester) in Britain.

By topic

Literature 
 Ovid completes the curse poem Ibis.

Births 
 November 17 – Vespasian, Roman emperor (d. AD 79)

Deaths 
 September 15 – Publius Quinctilius Varus, Roman general (b. 46 BC)
 Marcus Caelius, Roman centurion (b. c. 45 BC)

References 

 

als:0er#Johr 9